Meridian was between 2013 and 2020 the brand name of a regional rail service in Bavaria, Germany, operated by railway company Bayerische Oberlandbahn (BOB), owned by Transdev.

Since June 2020 these services are run under the brand Bayerische Regiobahn (BRB) of Transdev.

History 
In 2011 Bayerische Eisenbahngesellschaft signed a contract with Transdev (then Veolia Transport) to operate the "E-network Rosenheim" from December 2013, replacing previous operator DB Regio Bayern.

Since December 2013 Meridian operated three lines in Bavaria, from Munich to Salzburg, Rosenheim and Kufstein.

Services 
Services run out of Munich on the Munich–Rosenheim and Munich–Holzkirchen railway lines, and out of Rosenheim on the Rosenheim–Salzburg, Rosenheim–Kufstein and Mangfall Valley lines.

Meridian operated a fleet of 35 FLIRT3 electric multiple units from Stadler Rail.

Incidents
On 9 February 2016 the Bad Aibling rail accident occurred at Bad Aibling, Bavaria, in southeastern Germany. Two Meridian-branded trains were involved in a head-on collision in which 12 people were killed and 89 others were injured.

References

External links
 
  

Rail transport in Bavaria
Transport in Tyrol (state)
Transport in Salzburg (state)
Railway companies of Germany
Private railway companies of Germany